Arthur Hugh Henry Batten-Pooll VC MC (25 October 1891 – 21 January 1971) was an English recipient of the Victoria Cross, the highest and most prestigious award for gallantry in the face of the enemy that can be awarded to British and Commonwealth forces.

He was 24 years old, from Bath and was previously an officer with the Somerset Light Infantry and the 5th (Royal Irish) Lancers. He had requested to be transferred to an infantry regiment where one was likely to see action, was then a Lieutenant in the 3rd Battalion, The Royal Munster Fusiliers, British 1st Division during the First World War when the following deed took place for which he was awarded the VC.:

"On 25 June 1916 near Colonne, France, Lieutenant Henry-Batten-Pooll was in command of a raiding party when, on entering the enemy's lines he was severely wounded by a bomb which broke and mutilated all the fingers of his right hand. In spite of this he continued to direct operations with unflinching courage. Half an hour later during the withdrawal, while personally assisting in the rescue of other wounded men, he received two further wounds, but refusing assistance, he walked to within 100 yards of our lines when he fainted and was carried in by the covering party."

He later achieved the rank of captain.

His Victoria Cross is in the collections of the National Army Museum, Chelsea, London.

References

External links
Royal Munster Fusiliers
How his Trench V,C, was won

1891 births
1971 deaths
5th Royal Irish Lancers officers
Royal Munster Fusiliers officers
British Army personnel of World War I
British World War I recipients of the Victoria Cross
Recipients of the Military Cross
People from Knightsbridge
People educated at Eton College
Fellows of the Linnean Society of London
Alumni of Balliol College, Oxford
Somerset Light Infantry officers
British Army personnel of the Russian Civil War
British World War I prisoners of war
World War I prisoners of war held by Germany
British Army recipients of the Victoria Cross